Apollonius was a man of ancient Syria who was a Platonic philosopher. He lived about the time of the Roman emperor Hadrian—that is, the late 1st and early 2nd century AD—and is known to have inserted into his works an oracle which promised to Hadrian the government of the Roman world.

Notes

1st-century Syrian people
1st-century philosophers
2nd-century philosophers
Middle Platonists